Luis Altieri (born July 9, 1962, in Buenos Aires) is an Argentine visual artist and yogi.

He studied at the AEBA (Asociación Estímulo de Bellas Artes, Association Stimulus of Fine Arts), and later in workshops with Carlos Terribili, Carlos Tessarolo or Víctor Chab.

He has made individual or collective exhibitions in several places: Eduardo Sívori Museum, Buenos Aires, Argentina, 1996; Florida Museum of Hispanic and Latin American Art , Miami, United States, 1997; Galería Borkas, Lima, Peru, 1998; Casal de Cultura, Castelldefels, Spain, 2002; Galería Grillo Arte, Punta del Este, Uruguay, 2007, 2008, 2009, 2010, 2012; Kunst10Daagse, Bergen, Netherlands, 2002; etc.

References and external links 

www.luisaltieri.com

1962 births
Argentine painters
Argentine male painters
Abstract painters
Yogis
People from Buenos Aires
Living people